Kim Byung-suk (born 17 September 1985) is a South Korean footballer who plays for the K League 2 side Ansan Greeners.

Club career
Kim Byung-Suk started his professionally in 2007 on Portuguese Liga side Vitória Setúbal. On 30 December 2008, he signed for J1 League side Montedio Yamagata. He scored on his J1 League debut for Montedio Yamagata on 7 March, in the opening day win over Júbilo Iwata. On 1 December 2010, his contract was terminated, ending his two-year stay at the club.

On 2 March 2011, Kim joined J2 League club Sagan Tosu. On 18 January 2012, Kim moved from Japan to Saudi Arabia for Al Nassr FC, signing a six-month deal.

Club statistics

Honours
Vitória de Setúbal
Taça da Liga: 2007–08

References

External links

 

1985 births
Living people
Footballers from Seoul
South Korean footballers
Association football midfielders
South Korean expatriate footballers
South Korean expatriate sportspeople in Portugal
South Korean expatriate sportspeople in Japan
South Korean expatriate sportspeople in Saudi Arabia
Vitória F.C. players
Montedio Yamagata players
Al Nassr FC players
Sagan Tosu players
Daejeon Hana Citizen FC players
Ansan Mugunghwa FC players
Seoul E-Land FC players
Ansan Greeners FC players
Primeira Liga players
J1 League players
J2 League players
K League 1 players
K League 2 players
Expatriate footballers in Portugal
Expatriate footballers in Japan
Expatriate footballers in Saudi Arabia
Saudi Professional League players